Hasan Qeshlaqi (also Romanized as Ḩasan Qeshlāqī; also known as ‘Alī Qolī Qeshlāqī) is a village in Garamduz Rural District, Garamduz District, Khoda Afarin County, East Azerbaijan Province, Iran. At the 2006 census, its population was 42, in 10 families.

References 

Populated places in Khoda Afarin County